Option Lock is an original novel written by Justin Richards and based on the long-running British science fiction television series Doctor Who. It features the Eighth Doctor and Sam.

Synopsis
The Doctor and Sam land in present-day England on the ancestral home of the Silver family. However, the house holds clues to a dangerous centuries-old society and something that drove a man to suicide. Unravelling this will take Sam and the Doctor through time and space to save Earth from nuclear fire.

External links

1998 British novels
1998 science fiction novels
Eighth Doctor Adventures
Novels by Justin Richards